Mingora is a city in the Swat District of Khyber Pakhtunkhwa, Pakistan. Located on the Swat River, it is the 3rd largest city in Khyber Pakhtunkhwa and the 26th largest in Pakistan. Mingora is the largest city and the epicenter of social, cultural, and economic activities in Malakand Division, and also the largest in the northern part of Khyber Pakhtunkhwa.

History

The area around Mingora has long been inhabited. At Loe Banr, Butkara II and Matalai, Italian archaeologists unearthed 475 Indo-Aryan graves dated between 1520 and 170 BC and two horse skeletons. On the opposite side of the River Swat at Aligrama, near the Saidu Sharif airport, a site of Gandhara grave culture was discovered by Italian archaeologists and dated to 1000 BC.

Buddhism arose in the region with the arrival of monks from the Gangetic plains. Under Emperor Ashoka, Buddhism became firmly established in the region, and the region became a launching ground for Ashoka's expansion of Buddhist missionaries to the western regions from the Mediterranean and West Asia. Many Buddhist remains and carvings have been discovered near Mingora in the Jambil River Valley. At Panr, a stupa and monastery dated to the 1st century CE has been excavated. In Mingora, Faxian claimed to have seen the biggest Buddhist monastery, and large carving of the foot-prints of Buddha carved on the sides of the ridges at Teerat. Excavations at the Butkara Stupa near Mingora revealed a large and imposing central stupa surrounded by more than 200 votive stupas which were discovered by Pakistani archeologist in the 20th century. while the tomb of Akand of Swat, a local Buddhist ruler, and the archaeological remains of the Butkara Buddhist stupa were discovered during the British era.

Following the collapse of Buddhist rule, direct control of the area came under the Hindu Shahis. Their rule marked the assent of Hinduism and Hindu polity in the region once again, after centuries of Buddhist rule and domination of the area. Their rule came to an end with the rise of the Islamic empire of Mahmud Ghazni.

In 2007 during the rise of the Taliban insurgency, Mingora was invaded by the Taliban, largely impacting traditional culture in Mingora. A year later, the militant leader Fazlullah, then leader of Tehreek-e-Nafaz-e-Shariat-e-Mohammadi, established a pirated FM channel in the nearby Mamdheri village, approximately five kilometers away from Mingora. Fazlullah subsequently became leader of Tehrik-i-Taliban Pakistan in Swat Valley, encompassing the entirety of Mingora. The oppression of girls' education, Polio treatments, and freedom of expression became imminent throughout Mingora as a result, causing challenges for residents. Mingora's Green Square, once the hub of Mingora's social and cultural functions, became the execution grounds of Taliban opponents and dissidents, government officials, and civil workers, with corpses being hanged from electricity poles. Shabana, a local singer and dancer, was brutally shot and killed by the Taliban with her body being dumped in Mingora's main roundabout. In 2008, a suicide bomber killed about 40 people at a funeral.

The Operation Rah-e-Raast in 2009 placed Mingora back into Pakistani control.

Climate

Mingora features a humid subtropical climate (Cfa) under the Köppen climate classification. The average annual temperature in Mingora is 19.3 °C, while the annual precipitation averages 897  mm. November is the driest month with 22  mm of precipitation, while August, the wettest month, has an average precipitation of 134  mm.

June is the hottest month of the year with an average temperature of 29.2 °C. The coldest month January has an average temperature of 7.6 °C.

Notable people 
 Hazrat Miangul Shehzada Abdul Wadood Khan, Badshah sahib Founder of The Swat State. 
 Nazia Iqbal, Pashto singer
 Ghazala Javed (1988-2012), Pashto singer
 Nasir-ul-Mulk, former Pakistani Chief Justice
 Malala, Social Activist

See also 
 Green Square, Mingora
 Swat Museum
 Ghoriwala

References

External links
 UN Sustainable urbanization study of 08 Pakistani cities: UN-Habitat - NED Collaborative Project

Cities in Khyber Pakhtunkhwa
Populated places in Swat District